Edward Joel McCaskill (October 29, 1936 – March 3, 2016) was a Canadian professional ice hockey player who played four games in the National Hockey League and 91 games in the World Hockey Association between 1968 and 1974. He played with the Minnesota North Stars, and he then served as player-coach with the Los Angeles Sharks.

Playing career
McCaskill played junior hockey with the Kitchener Canucks and later the Kapuskasing Huskies, then made the move to the UK, playing two years in the British Ice Hockey Elite League. 

Upon returning to the US, he became a dominant force with the Nashville Dixie Flyers, and his offensive prowess earned the attention of NHL clubs, however, he would spend most of his playing years in the Western Hockey League with the Vancouver Canucks and Phoenix Roadrunners.

He was the father of former Major League Baseball pitcher and minor league hockey player Kirk McCaskill.  

He died in Phoenix, Arizona, in 2016 at the age of 79.

Career statistics

Regular season and playoffs

WHA coaching record

References

External links
 
Obituary at azcentral.com

1936 births
2016 deaths
Broome Dusters players
Canadian ice hockey centres
Deaths from Alzheimer's disease
Ice hockey people from Ontario
Kitchener Canucks players
Los Angeles Sharks players
Memphis South Stars players
Minnesota North Stars players
Murrayfield Racers players
Nashville Dixie Flyers players
Neurological disease deaths in Arizona
North American Hockey League (1973–1977) coaches
Paisley Pirates players
People from Kapuskasing
Phoenix Roadrunners (WHL) players
Vancouver Canucks (WHL) players
World Hockey Association coaches
Canadian expatriate ice hockey players in Scotland
Canadian expatriate ice hockey players in the United States